In ten-dimensional geometry, a 10-polytope is a 10-dimensional polytope whose boundary consists of 9-polytope facets, exactly two such facets meeting at each 8-polytope ridge.

A uniform 10-polytope is one which is vertex-transitive, and constructed from uniform facets.

Regular 10-polytopes 

Regular 10-polytopes can be represented by the Schläfli symbol {p,q,r,s,t,u,v,w,x}, with x {p,q,r,s,t,u,v,w} 9-polytope facets around each peak.

There are exactly three such convex regular 10-polytopes:
 {3,3,3,3,3,3,3,3,3} - 10-simplex
 {4,3,3,3,3,3,3,3,3} - 10-cube
 {3,3,3,3,3,3,3,3,4} - 10-orthoplex

There are no nonconvex regular 10-polytopes.

Euler characteristic 

The topology of any given 10-polytope is defined by its Betti numbers and torsion coefficients.

The value of the Euler characteristic used to characterise polyhedra does not generalize usefully to higher dimensions, and is zero for all 10-polytopes, whatever their underlying topology. This inadequacy of the Euler characteristic to reliably distinguish between different topologies in higher dimensions led to the discovery of the more sophisticated Betti numbers.

Similarly, the notion of orientability of a polyhedron is insufficient to characterise the surface twistings of toroidal polytopes, and this led to the use of torsion coefficients.

Uniform 10-polytopes by fundamental Coxeter groups 

Uniform 10-polytopes with reflective symmetry can be generated by these three Coxeter groups, represented by permutations of rings of the Coxeter-Dynkin diagrams:

Selected regular and uniform 10-polytopes from each family include:
 Simplex family: A10 [39] - 
 527 uniform 10-polytopes as permutations of rings in the group diagram, including one regular:
 {39} - 10-simplex - 
 Hypercube/orthoplex family: B10 [4,38] - 
 1023 uniform 10-polytopes as permutations of rings in the group diagram, including two regular ones:
 {4,38} - 10-cube or dekeract - 
 {38,4} - 10-orthoplex or decacross - 
 h{4,38} - 10-demicube .
 Demihypercube D10 family: [37,1,1] - 
 767 uniform 10-polytopes as permutations of rings in the group diagram, including:
 17,1 - 10-demicube or demidekeract - 
 71,1 - 10-orthoplex -

The A10 family 

The A10 family has symmetry of order 39,916,800 (11 factorial).

There are 512+16-1=527 forms based on all permutations of the Coxeter-Dynkin diagrams with one or more rings. 31 are shown below: all one and two ringed forms, and the final omnitruncated form. Bowers-style acronym names are given in parentheses for cross-referencing.

The B10 family 

There are 1023 forms based on all permutations of the Coxeter-Dynkin diagrams with one or more rings.

Twelve cases are shown below: ten single-ring (rectified) forms, and two truncations. Bowers-style acronym names are given in parentheses for cross-referencing.

The D10 family 

The D10 family has symmetry of order 1,857,945,600 (10 factorial × 29).

This family has 3×256−1=767 Wythoffian uniform polytopes, generated by marking one or more nodes of the D10 Coxeter-Dynkin diagram. Of these, 511 (2×256−1) are repeated from the B10 family and 256 are unique to this family, with 2 listed below. Bowers-style acronym names are given in parentheses for cross-referencing.

Regular and uniform honeycombs 

There are four fundamental affine Coxeter groups that generate regular and uniform tessellations in 9-space:

Regular and uniform tessellations include:
 Regular 9-hypercubic honeycomb, with symbols {4,37,4}, 
 Uniform alternated 9-hypercubic honeycomb with symbols h{4,37,4},

Regular and uniform hyperbolic honeycombs 

There are no compact hyperbolic Coxeter groups of rank 10, groups that can generate honeycombs with all finite facets, and a finite vertex figure. However, there are 3 paracompact hyperbolic Coxeter groups of rank 9, each generating uniform honeycombs in 9-space as permutations of rings of the Coxeter diagrams.

Three honeycombs from the  family, generated by end-ringed Coxeter diagrams are:
 621 honeycomb:  
 261 honeycomb:  
 162 honeycomb:

References 

 T. Gosset: On the Regular and Semi-Regular Figures in Space of n Dimensions, Messenger of Mathematics, Macmillan, 1900
 A. Boole Stott: Geometrical deduction of semiregular from regular polytopes and space fillings, Verhandelingen of the Koninklijke academy van Wetenschappen width unit Amsterdam, Eerste Sectie 11,1, Amsterdam, 1910
 H.S.M. Coxeter:
 H.S.M. Coxeter, M.S. Longuet-Higgins und J.C.P. Miller: Uniform Polyhedra, Philosophical Transactions of the Royal Society of London, Londne, 1954
 H.S.M. Coxeter, Regular Polytopes, 3rd Edition, Dover New York, 1973
 Kaleidoscopes: Selected Writings of H.S.M. Coxeter, edited by F. Arthur Sherk, Peter McMullen, Anthony C. Thompson, Asia Ivic Weiss, Wiley-Interscience Publication, 1995,  
 (Paper 22) H.S.M. Coxeter, Regular and Semi Regular Polytopes I, [Math. Zeit. 46 (1940) 380-407, MR 2,10]
 (Paper 23) H.S.M. Coxeter, Regular and Semi-Regular Polytopes II, [Math. Zeit. 188 (1985) 559-591]
 (Paper 24) H.S.M. Coxeter, Regular and Semi-Regular Polytopes III, [Math. Zeit. 200 (1988) 3-45]
 N.W. Johnson: The Theory of Uniform Polytopes and Honeycombs, Ph.D. Dissertation, University of Toronto, 1966

External links 
 Polytope names
 Polytopes of Various Dimensions, Jonathan Bowers
 Multi-dimensional Glossary
 

10-polytopes